Walter Agustín Pastorelli (born 9 September 1997) is an Argentine professional footballer who plays as a winger for DEPRO.

Career
Pastorelli is a product of the Patronato academy, having joined at the age of eight. In mid-2018, Pastorelli signed his first professional contract with the club. However, the winger's competitive debut wouldn't occur for more than two years. He was promoted into the first-team set-up under manager Gustavo Álvarez in mid-2020, with his senior debut arriving on 19 December in a Copa de la Liga Profesional home defeat to Aldosivi; he started and played seventy-three minutes, prior to being substituted off for Santiago Briñone. He scored his first goal on 27 December in an away loss against Defensa y Justicia.

In February 2022, Pastorelli moved to Torneo Argentino A side Club Defensores de Pronunciamiento.

Career statistics
.

Notes

References

External links

1997 births
Living people
People from Paraná, Entre Ríos
Argentine footballers
Association football midfielders
Club Atlético Patronato footballers
Argentine Primera División players
Torneo Argentino A players
Sportspeople from Entre Ríos Province